Izatha austera is a species of moth in the family Oecophoridae. It is endemic to New Zealand. The larvae of this species feed on dead wood by tunnelling into branches of its host species. The larvae matures from September and is on the wing in the months of December to January. The adult moth is variable in colouration but is seldom observed.

Taxonomy 
I. austera was first described, as Semiocosma austera, by Edward Meyrick in 1883, in brief, and again in greater detail in 1884. Meyrick used two specimens collected in the Botanic Garden and forest in Wellington in January. The lectotype specimen is held at the Natural History Museum, London. George Hudson discussed and illustrated this species in 1928.

Description 

Hudson described the larvae as follows:

  
Meyrick described the adults of the species as follows:  

The wingspan is 13–19 mm for males and 16.5–25 mm for females. This species is variable in its forewing colouration. I. austera also has noticeable scale-tufts on its forewing. It can be confused with I. dasydisca but the male can be distinguished as it has blackish coloured antennae, a scale-tuft on the third segment of the labial palp, and lacks the pair of large scale-tufts that I. dasydisca has on its forewings.

Distribution 
I. austera is endemic to New Zealand. This species is widespread throughout the North Island, with a single South Island record from north-west Nelson. This species is present in Northland, Auckland, Coromandel, Waikato, Bay of Plenty, Taranaki, Taupo, Gisborne, Hawkes Bay, Rangitikei, Wellington and Nelson districts.

Biology and behaviour 

Larvae live in silken tubes under the bark of dead branches of its host species.  The larvae live during winter months and are mature by the end of September.  Adults are on wing from December to February. This species have been collected via sugar traps or by beating shrubs during the daytime. I. austera only comes sparing to light. When resting on bare tree trunks the adult moth is very inconspicuous.

Habitat and host species 

Larvae feed during the winter in dead wood, including moist logs on the forest floor, and drier standing dead wood. They have been recorded from dead branches of Aristotelia serrata, Coprosma grandifolia and probably Coprosma robusta, Cordyline australis, Coriaria arborea, Laurelia novae-zelandiae, Litsea calicaris, Melicytus ramiflorus and Olearia rani. They tunnel into the wood and produce copious frass, which is often conspicuous on the outside of the affected branch. Many larvae often occur together in a single branch or log.

References

External links
 iNaturalist World Checklist

 Photograph of lectotype specimen

Oecophorinae
Moths of New Zealand
Endemic fauna of New Zealand
Moths described in 1883
Taxa named by Edward Meyrick
Endemic moths of New Zealand